Lady Eleanor Beaufort (1431 – 16 August 1501) was the daughter of Edmund Beaufort, 2nd Duke of Somerset (1406-1455), KG, and was a sister of the 3rd and 4th Dukes of Somerset.

Origins
She was the daughter of Edmund Beaufort, 2nd Duke of Somerset, KG (1406–1455), by his wife, Lady Eleanor Beauchamp. Eleanor Beauchamp was the daughter of Richard de Beauchamp, 13th Earl of Warwick, by his first wife, Elizabeth de Berkeley (herself daughter and heiress of Thomas de Berkeley, 5th Baron Berkeley, by his wife, Margaret de Lisle, 3rd Baroness Lisle); she was also an elder half-sister of Henry de Beauchamp, 1st Duke of Warwick, and Anne Neville, 16th Countess of Warwick.

Marriages and children
Eleanor Beaufort married twice. Her first marriage was in circa April 1458 to James Butler, 5th Earl of Ormond, 1st Earl of Wiltshire (d. 1461). Butler was Lieutenant of Ireland in 1453; when civil conflict broke out, the lieutenant fought on the Lancastrian side. He was present at the First Battle of St. Albans in 1455, Mortimer's Cross in 1461, and at the Battle of Towton. Butler also held the post of councilor to the Lancastrian Prince of Wales. After Towton, he was a proscribed as a traitor and was captured in the same year at Cockermouth and executed there in 1461.

Her second marriage was to Sir Robert Spencer of Spencer Combe in the parish of Crediton, Devon, by whom she had two daughters and co-heiresses: 
 Margaret Spencer (or Eleanor Spencer; 1472–1536); wife of Thomas Carey of Chilton Foliot, Wiltshire, second son of Sir William Carey (1437-1471) of Cockington, Devon. She had two sons:
 Sir John Carey (1491–1552) of Plashey, eldest son, ancestor to the Carey Viscounts Falkland.
 William Carey, her second son, the first husband of Anne Boleyn's sister Mary Boleyn and ancestor to the Carey Barons Hunsdon, Barons Carey of Leppington, Earls of Monmouth, Viscounts Rochford and Earls of Dover.
 Catherine Spencer (1477–1542); wife of Henry Percy, 5th Earl of Northumberland, and mother to Henry Percy, 6th Earl of Northumberland, an early love interest of Anne Boleyn.

Ancestry

References

Sources
 The royal descent of Nelson and Wellington, from Edward the first, George Russell French, 1853, p. 28
 The Rise and Fall of Anne Boleyn: Family Politics at the Court of Henry VIII, Retha Marvine Warnicke, 1984, p. 36
 The Baronetage of England: containing a genealogical and historical account of all the English, Edward Kimber, 1771, p. 221

1431 births
1501 deaths
People from Crediton
People from Wiltshire
15th-century English women
16th-century English women
15th-century English people
Daughters of English dukes
Wives of knights
Eleanor
Eleanor
Eleanor